The First National Bank is a historic bank building in downtown  Salt Lake City, Utah, United States, that is listed on the National Register of Historic Places (NRHP).

Description
The building is a 3-story commercial building designed by Thomas J. Thomson and Richard M. Upjohn and constructed in 1873. Originally four stories, the building lost its top floor to fire in 1875. The building has one of only two cast iron facades in the city, the other visible at the Z.C.M.I. Building. The First National Bank was added to the NRHP May 24, 1976.

Early History
Construction began on the First National Bank building in 1872 after demolition of the Commerce Building on East Temple Street. East Temple Street was renamed Main Street in 1906. The building featured a cast iron facade that was assembled as quickly as it arrived. Bank president Warren Hussey became the sole owner of the building and the bank in December, 1872. The building opened in September, 1873.

An early description of the building and its ornate decorations was printed in The Daily Graphic:

The Salt Lake Herald offered similar descriptions of the beautiful new building, but its opening coincided with the Panic of 1873, and depositors remained skeptical. Almost immediately the bank suspended payment on checks, citing a lack of currency. Reopening a month later, the bank operated for a year, and it soon received $30,000 in currency. However, the bank closed in November, 1874, and its building became the property of the Walker Brothers. John C. Ball was appointed receiver. 

Deseret National Bank opened temporary offices in the building in June, 1875. In November a fire destroyed the top floor and damaged adjacent buildings.

See also

 National Register of Historic Places listings in Salt Lake City

References

External links

National Register of Historic Places in Salt Lake City
Commercial buildings completed in 1873